Bad Decisions may refer to:

 Bad Decisions (The Last Vegas album), a 2012 album by The Last Vegas
 Bad Decisions, an unreleased album by Lil Twist
 Bad Decisions, a 2021 EP by RedHook
 "Bad Decisions" (The Strokes song), 2020
 "Bad Decisions" (Benny Blanco, BTS and Snoop Dogg song), 2022
 "Bad Decisions", a song by Ariana Grande from her 2016 album Dangerous Woman
 "Bad Decisions", a song by Bastille from their 2019 album Doom Days
 "Bad Decisions", a song by Two Door Cinema Club from their 2016 album Gameshow